The 1897 Indiana State Sycamores football team represented Indiana State University in the 1897 college football season.  This was the second team for the university and played  a schedule of six games; however, no records remain to record the scores or even the results.  The coach was R. Clark; also described as the team manager, the roster consisted of at least 11 lettermen.

This season marked the Sycamores first games vs. other colleges; though all game results are unknown.

Schedule

References

Indiana State
Indiana State Sycamores football seasons
Indiana State Sycamores football